The Şırnak Dam is a gravity dam on the Ortasu River (a tributary of the Hezil River) about  southeast of Şırnak town in Şırnak Province, southeast Turkey. Under contract from Turkey's State Hydraulic Works, AGE Inşaat began construction on the dam in 2008 and it was completed in 2012.

The reported purpose of the dam is water storage and it can also support a 5 MW hydroelectric power station in the future. Another purpose of the dam which has been widely reported in the Turkish press is to reduce the freedom of movement of Kurdistan Workers' Party (PKK) militants. Blocking and flooding valleys in close proximity to the Iraq–Turkey border is expected to help curb cross-border PKK smuggling and deny caves in which ammunition can be stored. A total of 11 dams along the border; seven in Şırnak Province and four in Hakkâri Province were implemented for this purpose. In Şırnak they are the Silopi Dam downstream of the Şırnak Dam on the Hezil River and upstream is the Uludere, Balli, Kavşaktepe, Musatepe and Çetintepe Dams on the Ortasu River. In Hakkari are the Gölgeliyamaç (since cancelled) and Çocuktepe Dams on the Güzeldere River and the Aslandağ and Beyyurdu Dams on the Bembo River.

See also
List of dams and reservoirs in Turkey

References

Dams in Şırnak Province
Gravity dams
Dams completed in 2012
Dams in the Tigris River basin
Roller-compacted concrete dams